The white-mantled kingfisher or New Britain kingfisher (Todiramphus albonotatus) is a species of bird in the family Alcedinidae.
It is endemic to New Britain off Papua New Guinea. Its natural habitat is tropical moist lowland forests.

Description 
The white-mantled kingfisher is 16–18 cm in length and has a black bill, and the plumage is mostly white in the male, with blue wings, tail, a turquoise crown, and a thick black stripe through the eye. The female is similar to the male but has blue on the lower back.
The call is a rapid descending "kee-ku-ko-ko" or a trilling "ki-ki-ki-ki-ki".
  
It is widespread but scarce and is probably threatened by habitat loss.

References

white-mantled kingfisher
Birds of New Britain
white-mantled kingfisher
Taxonomy articles created by Polbot